Alice Cooper Trashes the World is a live concert video by Alice Cooper.

The concert was filmed in Birmingham, England, December 1989, during Cooper's tour in support of his commercially successful album Trash.

Track listing
 "Trash"
 "Billion Dollar Babies"
 "I'm Eighteen"
 "I'm Your Gun"
 "Desperado"
 "House of Fire"
 "No More Mr. Nice Guy"
 "This Maniac's in Love with You"
 "Steven"
 "Welcome to My Nightmare"
 "Ballad of Dwight Fry"
 "Gutter Cats Vs The Jets"
 "Only Women Bleed"
 "I Love the Dead"
 "Poison"
 "Muscle of Love"
 "Spark in the Dark"
 "Bed of Nails"
 "School's Out"
 "Under My Wheels"
 End credits - "Only My Heart Talkin'"

The band

 Alice Cooper – vocals
 Al Pitrelli – guitar
 Pete Friesen – guitar
 Derek Sherinian – keyboards
 Tommy Caradonna – bass
 Jonathan Mover – drums
 Devon Meade – backing vocals

References

Concert films
Alice Cooper